The Ratanakosin-class corvettes are a class of two corvettes that were built for the Royal Thai Navy in the 1980s. Constructed by Tacoma Boatbuilding Company in the United States, a third was planned to be built in Thailand but was canceled before construction could begin. The Ratanakosin class is used as flagships for squadrons of fast attack craft. 

One of the two, sank in a storm on 18 December 2022.

Design
The Ratanakosin class is based on the Saudi Arabian design. The ships have a complement of 15 officers and 72 enlisted.

The class is equipped with one Decca 1226 and one HSA ZW-06 surface-search radar, one HSA DA-05 air/surface-search radar, one HSA WM-25 fire-control radar, one HSA LIROD-8 optical fire-control system, and one STN Atlas DSQS-21C hull-mounted sonar. The corvettes are armed with two quad launchers for eight RGM-84 Harpoon anti-ship missiles and one octuple Albatros launcher for 24 Selenia Aspide surface-to-air missiles (SAM). Furthermore, the vessels are armed with one Otobreda  gun, two Bofors  guns in a twin Otobreda mount, and two  Oerlikon GAM-B01 cannons. The Ratanakosin class is also equipped with two Mark 32 triple torpedo tubes for Sting Ray torpedoes.

Ships in the class

Construction and career
The Royal Thai Navy ordered two corvettes from Tacoma Boatbuilding Company in Tacoma, Washington, United States on 9 May 1983. The lead ship was laid down on 6 February 1984. Named Ratanakosin, the vessel was launched on 11 March 1986. The second ship in the class was laid down on 26 March 1984. Named Sukhothai, the vessel was launched on 20 July 1986. Ratanakosin was commissioned on 26 September 1986 and Sukhothai on 19 February 1987. The third ship, which was planned for construction in Thailand, was canceled before construction began. Ratanakosin-class corvettes are used as flagships for squadrons of fast attack craft.

Sukhothai sank in a storm on 18 December 2022.

See also
 , identically named class from the 1920s

References

Notes

Bibliography

External links

Corvette classes
Ships built by Tacoma Boatbuilding Company
Ships of the Royal Thai Navy